Bezirk Judenburg was a district of the state of Styria in Austria. On January 1, 2012, Judenburg District and Knittelfeld District were merged to Murtal District.

Municipalities
Suburbs, hamlets and other subdivisions of a municipality are indicated in small characters.
 Amering
Großprethal, Kathal in Obdachegg, Kleinprethal, Obdachegg, Sankt Georgen in Obdachegg
 Bretstein
 Eppenstein
Mühldorf, Schoberegg, Schwarzenbach am Größing
 Fohnsdorf
Aichdorf, Dietersdorf, Hetzendorf, Kumpitz, Rattenberg, Sillweg, Wasendorf
 Hohentauern
Triebental
 Judenburg
Tiefenbach, Waltersdorf
 Maria Buch-Feistritz
Allersdorf, Feistritz, Maria Buch
 Obdach
Granitzen, Rötsch, Warbach
 Oberkurzheim
Götzendorf, Katzling, Mauterndorf, Mosing, Thaling, Unterzeiring, Winden
 Oberweg
Ossach
 Oberzeiring
Gföllgraben, Zeiringgraben, Zugtal
 Pöls
Allerheiligen, Allerheiligengraben, Enzersdorf, Greith, Gusterheim, Mühltal, Offenburg, Paig, Paßhammer, Pölshof, Sauerbrunn, Thalheim, Thaling
 Pusterwald
 Reifling
Auerling, Feeberg
 Reisstraße
Kothgraben
 Sankt Anna am Lavantegg
Bärnthal, Lavantegg, Sankt Anna-Feriensiedlung, Winterleiten, Zanitzen
 Sankt Georgen ob Judenburg
Pichlhofen, Scheiben, Wöll
 Sankt Johann am Tauern
Sankt Johann am Tauern Schattseite, Sankt Johann am Tauern Sonnseite
 Sankt Oswald-Möderbrugg
Möderbrugg, Sankt Oswald
 Sankt Peter ob Judenburg
Feistritzgraben, Furth, Mitterdorf, Möschitzgraben, Pichl, Rach, Rothenthurm
 Sankt Wolfgang-Kienberg
Katschwald, Kienberg, Mönchegg
 Unzmarkt-Frauenburg
Frauenburg, Unzmarkt
 Weißkirchen in Steiermark
 Zeltweg
Farrach

References

Murtal District
Districts of Styria